Aleksey Fyodorov may refer to:

 Aleksey Fyodorov (triple jumper) (born 1991), Russian triple jumper
 Alexei Fedorov (born 1972), Belarus chess grandmaster
 Oleksiy Fedorov (1901–1989), Soviet resistance fighter in German-occupied Ukraine